Eirene is a genus of hydrozoans in the family Eirenidae.

Species
The genus contains the following species:

Eirene averuciformis Du, Xu, Huang & Guo, 2010
Eirene brevigona Kramp, 1959
Eirene brevistyloides Du, Xu, Huang & Guo, 2010
Eirene brevistylus Huang & Xu, 1994
Eirene ceylonensis Browne, 1905
Eirene conica Du, Xu, Huang & Guo, 2010
Eirene elliceana (Agassiz & Mayer, 1902)
Eirene gibbosa (McCrady, 1859)
Eirene hexanemalis (Goette, 1886)
Eirene kambara Agassiz & Mayer, 1899
Eirene lactea (Mayer, 1900)
Eirene lacteoides Kubota & Horita, 1992
Eirene menoni Kramp, 1953
Eirene mollis Torrey, 1909
Eirene palkensis Browne, 1905
Eirene parvitentaculata Bouillon, 1984
Eirene pentanemalis Lin, Xu & Huang, 2013
Eirene proboscidea Bouillon & Barnett, 1999
Eirene pyramidalis (Agassiz, 1862)
Eirene tenuis (Browne, 1905)
Eirene troglodyta Watson, 1998
Eirene viridula (Péron & Lesueur, 1810)
Eirene xiamenensis Huang, Xu & Lin, 2010

References

Eirenidae
Hydrozoan genera